The 1956 French Championships (now known as the French Open) was a tennis tournament that took place on the outdoor clay courts at the Stade Roland-Garros in Paris, France. The tournament ran from 15 May until 26 May. It was the 60th staging of the French Championships, and the second Grand Slam tennis event of 1956. Lew Hoad and Althea Gibson won the singles titles.

Finals

Men's singles

 Lew Hoad defeated  Sven Davidson 6–4, 8–6, 6–3

Women's singles

 Althea Gibson defeated  Angela Mortimer 6–0, 12–10

Men's doubles

 Don Candy /  Robert Perry  defeated  Ashley Cooper /  Lew Hoad  7–5, 6–3, 6–3

Women's doubles

 Angela Buxton /  Althea Gibson defeated  Darlene Hard /  Dorothy Head Knode 6–8, 8–6, 6–1

Mixed doubles

 Thelma Coyne Long /  Luis Ayala defeated  Darlene Hard /  Bob Howe  4–6, 6–4, 6–1

References

External links
 French Open official website

French Championships
1956
French Championships
French Championships
French Championships